Schmale Sinn (in its upper course in Bavaria: Kleine Sinn) is a river of Bavaria and Hesse, Germany. It is a right tributary of the Sinn near Zeitlofs. Via the Franconian Saale it discharges into the Main.

See also
List of rivers of Hesse

References

Rivers of Hesse
Rivers of Bavaria
Rivers of Germany